Amin Farouk (born 22 July 2003) is a German footballer who plays as a midfielder for FSV Frankfurt on loan from Wehen Wiesbaden.

Club career
On 27 January 2023, Farouk was loaned by FSV Frankfurt.

Career statistics

Club

Weblinks

References

2003 births
Living people
German footballers
Egyptian footballers
German people of Egyptian descent
Association football midfielders
1. FSV Mainz 05 players
SV Wehen Wiesbaden players
FSV Frankfurt players
3. Liga players